Enter Madame may refer to:

Enter Madame (play)
Enter Madame (1922 film)
Enter Madame (1935 film)